9Spitch is a gravitationally lensed system of two galaxies. It was discovered in January 2014 by Zbigniew "Zbish" Chetnik, an amateur astronomer from Northamptonshire, England, while classifying images on the website Spacewarps.org. The discovery was announced on the BBC television programme Stargazing Live.

The term Spitch comes from Chetnik's nickname Zbish, after a BBC producer misheard his nickname.

Observations 
The Red Radio Ring (RRR) was discovered by four independent groups, including the Space Warps project using deep images from the Canada–France–Hawaii Telescope, a cross-match with Herschel-SPIRE and Planck images at 350 μm to identify strongly lensed dusty star-forming galaxies (DSFGs) and follow up with Large Millimeter Telescope, a detection with Herschel-SPIRE 500 μm images to identify strongly lensed DSFGs, and identification of 9Spitch as the strongest lensed DSFG in the 278 GHz maps from the Atacama Cosmology Telescope (ACT) and follow-up with the Green Bank Telescope.

The galaxy was studied with the Large Millimetre Telescope, which detected carbon monoxide in the lensed galaxy, and the Subaru Telescope, which detected different spectroscopic lines associated with star formation in the lensed galaxy. This study suggests a high star forming rate of about 2500 Mʘ yr −1 or a thousand times the star forming rate of the Milky Way. In the paper the name 9io9 is used instead of 9Spitch. The source reconstruction supports a compact core and an extended region, maybe indicative of a jet or lobe coming from an active galactic nucleus (AGN). The galaxy might be in the center of a large galaxy group or cluster and it will likely evolve into a massive elliptical galaxy.

Observations with the Northern Extended Millimeter Array (NOEMA) and detailed reconstruction of the lensed galaxy suggests an approximately  diameter rotating disk of gas.

9Spitch was observed with the Atacama Large Millimeter Array (ALMA) 12-meter antennas in December 2017 as part of project 2017.1.00814.S. The data revealed the presence of atomic carbon and carbon monoxide as a tracer of star formation. This is explained as a possible interaction between material outflowing from the AGN and interstellar material.

Harrington et al. (2019) reports four independent detections of the Red Radio Ring, including the detection with Space Warps. In their paper they report new Atacama Pathfinder Experiment (APEX) observations, presenting the detection of nitrogen [N II] 205 μm. The velocity structure of the nitrogen is similar to carbon monoxide and they concluded that both share the same volume. The ratio of the nitrogen luminosity and the infrared luminosity resembles more a normal star-forming galaxy and less a galaxy with star-formation influenced by a quasar.

References

External links
 ASW0009io9 record at Spacewarps.org
  at SIMBAD
 

Overlapping galaxies
Gravitational lensing
20140116
Astronomy in the United Kingdom
Cetus (constellation)